In Greek mythology, Oeagrus was a king of Thrace.

Biography

Kingdom 
There are various versions as to where Oeagrus' domain was actually situated. In one version, he ruled over the Edonian kingdom in the region of Mygdonia. He is also connected with Pieria, further west, or to the vicinity of the River Hebrus to the east, the latter was said to be called 'Oeagria', in his honor.

Family 
In the version that places Oeagrus in Pieria, his father is given as King Pierus and the nymph Methone. He was described as "a Thracian wine-god, who was himself descended from Atlas."  According to Suda, Oiagros was in the fifth generation after Atlas, by Alkyone, one of his daughters. This can be explained by the following genealogy: (1) Atlas by Pleione — (2) Alcyone by Poseidon — (3) Aethusa by Apollo — (4) Linus or Eleuther — (5) Pierus by Methone — Oeager. This was supported by the order of genealogy according to the historian Charax which as follows: Aethuse the Thracian was the mother of Linus, the father of Pierus, the father of Oeagrus.

In the account that places him in Edonia he is said to be the son of Charops, an adherent of the god Dionysus; Charops was invited by Dionysus to rule over the Edones after the violent death of their king Lycurgus. Oeagrus has also sometimes been called the son of the god Ares, who was associated with Thrace. 

Oeagrus and the Muse Calliope or Clio or Polymnia were the parents of Orpheus and Linus. He married Calliope close to Pimpleia, Olympus. The sisters of Orpheus are called Oeagrides, in the sense of the Muses. The father of Orpheus was sometimes given as Apollo. Oeagrus was also mentioned as the father of Marsyas.

Mythology 
In Nonnus' Dionysiaca, the author states that Oeagrus quitted his city of Pimpleia on the Bistonian plain and followed the enterprise of Dionysos against the Indian people. He left his newly-born son Orpheus in the charge of his consort Calliopeia. 

Oeagrus was also described as a singer and harpist, and a skilled warrior during this adventures.

Honours
Oeagrus Beach in Antarctica is named after the mythical king.

References

Sources
Kathleen Freeman. The Pre-Socratic Philosophers. Oxford: Basil Blackwell, 1946.
Children of Ares
Mythological kings of Thrace
Kings in Greek mythology
Thracian characters in Greek mythology
Thraco-Macedonian mythology